The Sha Tin Trophy is a horse race for horses aged four and over, run at a distance of 1,600 metres (one mile) on turf in October at Sha Tin Racecourse in Hong Kong.

The Sha Tin Trophy was first contested in 1997. It was upgraded to International Group 2 class in 2016.

Records
Record time:
 1:32.82 – Rise High 2019

Most successful horse:
 2 – Beauty Generation 2017, 2018

Most wins by a jockey:
 4 – Zac Purton 2012, 2014, 2018, 2022

Most wins by a trainer:
 5 – John Moore 2005, 2006, 2006, 2017, 2018

Winners

See also
 List of Hong Kong horse races

References
Racing Post:
, 

Recurring events established in 1997
1997 establishments in Hong Kong
Horse races in Hong Kong